Stade Babemba Traoré is a multi-use stadium in Sikasso, Mali.  It is currently used mostly for football matches. It serves as a home ground of Stade Malien de Sikasso.  It also hosted some matches for the 2002 African Cup of Nations.  The stadium holds 30,000 people and was opened in 2001.

Babemba Traore
Sikasso
Sports venues completed in 2001
2001 establishments in Mali